Lope Sherani is town and union council of Dera Bugti District in the Balochistan province of Pakistan. The area contains one basic health unit, and eight schools.

References

Populated places in Dera Bugti District
Union councils of Balochistan, Pakistan